Kasossos was a town of ancient Caria. It evidently contained an important temple or sanctuary that was shown favour by the Hecatomnids when they ruled Caria. Its townspeople appear in ancient inscriptions recovered in Caria.
 
Its site is located near Ulaş, Asiatic Turkey.

References

Populated places in ancient Caria
Former populated places in Turkey